East (or Eastern) Aberdeenshire was a Scottish county constituency of the House of Commons of the Parliament of the United Kingdom from 1868 to 1918 and from 1950 to 1983. It elected one Member of Parliament (MP) by the first past the post system of election.

During the period 1918 to 1950, the area of the constituency was divided between East Aberdeenshire and Kincardineshire and Central Aberdeenshire and Kincardineshire, which were both entirely within the county of Aberdeen.

In 1983, the East Aberdeenshire area was divided between the new constituencies of Banff and Buchan and Gordon.

Boundaries

Eastern Aberdeenshire, 1868 to 1918

1868 to 1885 

When, created by the Representation of the People (Scotland) Act 1868, and first used in the 1868 general election, the constituency was nominally one of three covering the county of Aberdeen. The other two were the county constituency of West Aberdeenshire and the burgh constituency of Aberdeen. The county had been covered previously by the Aberdeenshire constituency and the Aberdeen constituency.

East Aberdeenshire was defined by the 1868 legislation as consisting of the parishes of Aberdour, Belhelvie, Bourtie, Crimond, Cruden, Daviot, Ellon, Fintray, Foveran, Fraserburgh, Fyvie, Keith-hall and Kinkell, King-Edward, Logie-Buchan, Longside, Lonmay, Methlick, Montquhitter, New Deer, New Machar, Old Deer, Oldmeldrum, Peterhead, Pitsligo, Rathen, Slains, Strichen, Tarves, Turriff, Tyrie and Udny, together with the part of the parish of Old Machar lying east of the River Don, and the parish of St Fergus in Banffshire.

1868 boundaries were also used in the 1874 general election and the 1880 general election.

1885 to 1918 

For the 1885 general election the burgh constituencies of Aberdeen North and Aberdeen South were created. Both of these new constituencies included areas beyond the boundaries of the burgh of Aberdeen.

1885 boundaries were also used in the 1886 general election, the 1892 general election, the 1895 general election, the 1900 general election, the 1906 general election, the January 1910 general election and the December 1910 general election.

County boundaries were redefined under the Local Government (Scotland) Act 1889, and the city of Aberdeen (a county of city) was created in 1900, but these developments did not affect constituency boundaries.

In 1918, the Representation of the People Act 1918 created new constituency boundaries, taking account of new local government boundaries, and grouped the county of Aberdeen, the city of Aberdeen and the county of Kincardine in the creation of new constituencies for the 1918 general election.

East Aberdeenshire, 1950 to 1983

1950 to 1955 

The House of Commons (Redistribution of Seats) Act 1949 created new boundaries for the 1950 general election, and East Aberdeenshire was created as one of four constituencies covering the county of Aberdeen and the city of Aberdeen. East Aberdeenshire and West Aberdeenshire were entirely within the county, and Aberdeen North and Aberdeen South were entirely within the city. East Aberdeenshire consisted of the burghs of Ellon, Fraserburgh, Huntly, Peterhead, Rosehearty and Turriff and the districts of Deer, Ellon, Huntly and Turriff.

The same boundaries were used for the 1951 general election.

1955 to 1983 

For the 1955 general election, the burgh of Huntly and the district of Huntly were transferred to West Aberdeenshire.

East Aberdeenshire retained the same boundaries for the 1959 general election, the 1964 general election, the 1966 general election, the 1970 general election,  the February 1974 general election and the October 1974 general election.

In 1975, throughout Scotland, under the Local Government (Scotland) Act 1973, counties and burghs were abolished as local government areas, and East Aberdeenshire became a constituency within the Grampian region.

The 1979 general election was held before a review of constituency boundaries took account of new local government boundaries.

For the 1983 general election, the East Aberdeenshire area was divided between the new constituencies of Banff and Buchan and Gordon.

Members of Parliament

Eastern Aberdeenshire, 1868 to 1918

East Aberdeenshire, 1950 to 1983

Election results

Elections in the 1860s

Elections in the 1870s

Fordyce's death caused a by-election.

Elections in the 1880s

Elections in the 1890s

Elections in the 1900s

Elections in the 1910s 

General Election 1914–15:

Another General Election was required to take place before the end of 1915. The political parties had been making preparations for an election to take place and by the July 1914, the following candidates had been selected; 
Liberal: Henry Cowan
Unionist: Malcolm Barclay-Harvey

Elections in the 1950s

Elections in the 1960s

Elections in the 1970s

See also 
 Former United Kingdom Parliament constituencies

References 

Historic parliamentary constituencies in Scotland (Westminster)
Constituencies of the Parliament of the United Kingdom established in 1868
Constituencies of the Parliament of the United Kingdom disestablished in 1918
Constituencies of the Parliament of the United Kingdom established in 1950
Constituencies of the Parliament of the United Kingdom disestablished in 1983
Politics of the county of Aberdeen
History of Aberdeenshire